1995 saw the Sturt Football Club set a number of unwanted South Australian National Football League records:

 The first (and to date only) team in the VFL/AFL, SANFL or WAFL to finish with a 0–22 record
 The first team in the VFL/AFL, SANFL or WAFL since Fitzroy and Central District in 1964 to finish with a winless season
 The furthest a team in the VFL/AFL, SANFL or WAFL has ever been from winning a game: not once did the Double Blues come within four goals of their opponents at the final siren
 A seventh consecutive wooden spoon, beating St Kilda’s VFL record from 1897-1902 and Woodville's SANFL record from 1980-85
 Finished seven games behind second-last placed Woodville-West Torrens, equaling St Kilda’s VFL record from 1902

Background 
The Sturt Football Club experienced a long-term decline following a record 1978 season that saw the team win a SANFL record 21 of 22 games, but then lose the 1978 Grand Final by the narrowest of margins to Norwood. The Double Blues fell from minor premiers to ninth of ten clubs in 1979, and although they recovered to make the Grand Final in 1983 with Rick Davies kicking a then-SANFL record 151 goals, after the controversial sacking of Mervyn Keane at the end of a 1988 season that had seen the club rise from second last to finalists and apparently to potential premiership contenders, the club went into free-fall under the coaching of Davies in 1989. That season the Double Blues won only four games and towards the end as their on-field performances deteriorated the off-field strife that had seen Keane sacked recurred, with Davies resigning after Glenelg beat them by 132 points in the final match.

A succession of coaches failed to lift the Double Blues off the bottom of the table: the team won only sixteen of 106 games between 1990 and 1994, and following the sacking of legendary coach Haydn Bunton junior who guided the Double Blues to only nine wins in 42 games, Sturt entered a serious crisis as many experienced players left the club, notably skipper Jay Viney to North Adelaide, Damian Kitschke to study abroad, Stuart Wigney to Glenelg and ultimately Richmond plus Chris Williams and spearhead Jody Arnol to Darwin.

After an attempt to merge with Norwood and enter the AFL was rejected, Phil Carman, a former VFL star originally from Edenhope, took the reins on a three-year contract for 1995 after having been Sturt’s fitness coordinator. Nevertheless, the Double Blues’ inexperienced list almost never threatened any of its opponents and by mid-season it was clear that a win was unlikely and results became even worse later on; for instance, in a game against West Adelaide regarded the previous week as Sturt’s “best chance for a win this season”, West Adelaide, when two goals ahead at quarter time, set a goal of keeping the Double Blues goalless on a rain-soaked Adelaide Oval in the last three quarters and succeeded.

Schedule and results

Aftermath 
Following the 1995 season, it appeared certain that Sturt would not be able to survive for 1996 – indeed the 1995 players began training as soon as the horrific season finished, under uncertainty as to where they would be playing in 1996.

On 9 October 1995, a merger plan with North Adelaide was officially launched and the general public expected it to go through quietly, but a major membership drive to raise the $250,000 needed to keep the club afloat was a surprising success: in the following two months, the Double Blues’ membership rose from seven hundred to two thousand, and as Unley councillor Phil Sanders had feared, the merger with North did collapse.

Sturt were also able to engage in significant recruiting for the first time since the off-field strife of 1988 and 1989, acquiring twice Magarey Medal runner-up Brodie Atkinson and a number of lesser players. Carman, as promised when he began coaching the Double Blues, retained the coaching job for 1996 despite being on a 24-game losing streak. Sturt broke their 27 games losing streak against West Adelaide in Round 3 of 1996, but four wins and an eighth successive wooden spoon was seen as disappointing after the off-season off-field efforts. It was only in 1997, after further changes to the club’s administrative personnel, that the Double Blues improved seriously, rising from perpetual wooden spooners to fourth place. In 1998, Sturt played in the grand final against rival Port Adelaide but went down by 9 points. The club continued to be competitive on the field and club finances improved with the ultimate success achieved in 2002, beating Central District by 47 points to win its first flag since 1976.

Steady finals performances and strong financials kept the club afloat for a while, but another exodus of players led to two consecutive wooden spoons, and further heavy losses left the SANFL recommending that Sturt relocate or shut its doors in the 2011 off-season.

Strong executive leadership, key changes to the football and business departments and targeted recruitment, including signing premiership player Marty Mattner as coach in 2016, saw Sturt go back to back for 2016/17 with a 27 point win over favourite Woodville West Torrens in 2016, and another underdog win over Port Adelaide by one point in 2017.

References 

Sturt Football Club season
1995 Sturt Football Club season